WQVE (101.7 FM, "V 101.7") is a radio station serving Albany, Georgia, United States, and surrounding cities with an urban adult contemporary music format. This station is under ownership of Rick Lambert and Bob Spencer, through licensee First Media Services, LLC.  Its studios are on Broad Avenue just west of downtown Albany, and the transmitter is located north of Albany.

On April 30, 2020, Cumulus Media sold its entire Albany cluster for First Media Services for $450,000. The sale was consummated on December 15, 2020.

References

External links
V 101.7 WQVE official website

QVE
Urban adult contemporary radio stations in the United States
Radio stations established in 1958
1958 establishments in Georgia (U.S. state)